Daniel Omar Juárez (born 14 March 1988) is an Argentine road cyclist, who currently rides for UCI Continental team .

Major results

2013
 1st Overall Doble Calingasta
1st Stage 1
 1st Mendoza–San Juan
 1st Stage 6 Vuelta a Mendoza
2015
 1st  Road race, National Road Championships
 1st Clásica 1 de Mayo
2016
 Volta Ciclística Internacional do Rio Grande do Sul
1st  Points classification
1st Stage 2
 5th Road race, National Road Championships
2018
 1st  Mountains classification Vuelta a San Juan
2020
 1st Stage 2 Giro del Sol San Juan
2023
 9th Overall Giro del Sol

References

External links

1988 births
Living people
Argentine male cyclists
Sportspeople from Chaco Province